Commercial Bank of Greece was a Greek bank. Its headquarters was in Athens. On 1 February 2013, Alpha Bank bought Commercial Bank.

History

The Commercial Bank of Greece (CBG) was established in London by the Greek banker Gregorios Empedocles (Γρηγόριος Εμπεδοκλής in Greek) in 1907 and two years later listed on the stock exchange. In 1922, CBG established Commercial Bank of the Near East (CBNE) in London with CBG as a major shareholder and with the banker Nicolas Christofides as chief manager. The latter expanded CBG's international operations further by opening a first branch of the Commercial Bank of the Near East in Constantinople in 1922, a second one in Alexandria in 1925, and subsequently another in Cairo. Nicolas Christofides, who settled in Alexandria in the 1920s-30s, managed the Turkish and Egyptian branches of the CBNE until the 1960s.

After the Suez Crisis in 1956, Egypt nationalized the operations of British and French banks. To avoid nationalization, in 1957, N. Christofides convinced the Egyptian authorities that the Commercial Bank of the Near East, despite its official British nationality, was unofficially Greek, arguing that all shareholders and clients were Greek. Thus, CBNE, which was incorporated in London, transferred its branches in Egypt to Commercial Bank of Greece. This proved to be of only temporary help as in 1960 the Egyptian government nationalized all banks in Egypt, including CBG’s branches in Cairo and Alexandria.

At about the same time, i.e., in 1959, CBG acquired the Greek operations of Ionian Bank, including its ownership of Popular Bank. CBG continued to operate the bank separately, and later renamed it Ionian and Popular Bank of Greece. CBG also acquired a major shareholding in Banque du Piree (Piraeus Bank), which had been established in 1916. CBG continued to grow in Greece via acquisition when in it acquired a major share holding (29% in 1995) in Bank of Attica, which had been established in 1925.

In 1965, CBG entered the European Common Market when it created Griechische Handelsbank in Frankfurt am Main. Later this subsidiary changed its name to Commercial Bank of Greece (Germany).

Twenty-five years later, in 1990, CBG renamed its subsidiary in London to Commercial Bank of London.

In 1994 CBG finally opened its first branch in Nicosia, Cyprus. The next year CBG’s International Banking Unit in Limassol, Cyprus commenced operations. CBG also started to expand in the former Communist countries. First, it became a strategic investor in Bulgarian Investment Bank. However, CBG sold Commercial Bank of London to Alpha Credit Bank (now Alpha Bank), which renamed it Alpha Bank London.

In 1996 Bulgarian Investment Bank became International Commercial Bank (Bulgaria). CBG owned 91%, directly and indirectly, of the bank. CBG also established a wholly owned subsidiary, International Commercial Black Sea Bank (Romania), which later became  (Romania). CBG establishes International Commercial Black Sea Bank (Georgia) together with the EBRD and United Georgian Bank. (United Georgian Bank was the result of the merger of three banks: Industrial Bank, Eximbank and New Georgian Bank – formerly Savings Bank.)

While it was expanding internationally, CBG started to rationalize its Greek holding. Thus in 1997 CBG reduced its position in Attica Bank to 18%. More importantly, two years later it sold its 51% stake in Ionian Bank to Alpha Credit Bank. In 2001, CBG  incorporated Commercial Bank of Greece (Cyprus), of which it owned 75%, and to which it contributed its four branches in Cyprus and its International Banking Unit there. At some point, Commercial Bank of Greece rebranded all its operations as Emporiki Bank.

CBG's second move into the former Communist bloc occurred in 1998 when it established International Commercial Bank (Moldova), and Commercial Bank of Greece (Armenia). The next year CBG established a representative office in Odessa, and Intercommercial Bank (Albania) SA, which started operating in 2000. In 2000, CBG acquired Romanian International Commercial Black Sea Bank and 35% of FinCom Bank in Moldova. However, in 2002, CBG started to undo its previous international expansion outside the Greek-speaking parts of the Mediterranean. First it disposed of its subsidiaries in Armenia, Georgia and Moldova. Then in 2005, Emporiki Bank disposed of its German subsidiary.

In 2011 Crédit Agricole bought 95% of the stocks and took the bank from the stock market. The profitable subsidiaries in Albania, Bulgaria and Romania where integrated into Crédit Agricole. Subsequently, the less profitable branch in Greece fall into crisis and was sold off one year later to Alpha Bank for €1.

See also
List of banks in Greece

References

External links

Defunct banks of Greece
Former Crédit Agricole subsidiaries
Former Greek subsidiaries of foreign companies
Banks established in 1907
Greek companies established in 1907
Companies based in Athens